Nong Bon is a khwaeng (subdistrict) of Prawet District, in Bangkok, Thailand. In 2020, it had a total population of 41,429 people.

References

Subdistricts of Bangkok
Prawet district